Caitlin Pringle (born 4 December 1993)  is a Scottish female badminton player. She competed at the 2014 Commonwealth Games in Glasgow, Scotland.

Achievements

BWF International Challenge/Series
Women's Doubles

 BWF International Challenge tournament
 BWF International Series tournament
 BWF Future Series tournament

References

External links

 

1993 births
Living people
Sportspeople from Glasgow
Scottish female badminton players
Commonwealth Games competitors for Scotland
Badminton players at the 2014 Commonwealth Games